Thurakkatha Vathil is a 1970 Indian Malayalam film,  directed by P. Bhaskaran and produced by A. Raghunath. The film stars Prem Nazir, Madhu, (Ragini) Jayabharathi and Sreelatha Namboothiri. The film's musical score was by K. Raghavan. The movie received the National Award for the best film on National Integration in 1970. It was he second Malayalam film to win this award. The first was Janmabhoomi in 1967. Philomina won the Kerala State Film Award for Second Best Actress for this movie.

Cast

Prem Nazir- Bappu
Madhu- Vasu
Ragini- Sulekha
Jayabharathi- Nabeesa
Philomina- Umma
Sreelatha Namboothiri- Ambujam
Bahadoor- Narayanankutty
B. K. Pottekkad
C. A. Balan as Kuttan Nair
Khadeeja
Nellikode Bhaskaran as Ali Mullakka
Radhamani
Raghava Menon
Ramankutty

Soundtrack
The music was composed by K. Raghavan and the lyrics were written by P. Bhaskaran.

References

External links
 

1970 films
1970s Malayalam-language films
Best Film on National Integration National Film Award winners
Films directed by P. Bhaskaran